Sivagami is a 2018 Tamil-language family drama starring Nakshatra Srinivas, Benito, Anandhakrishnan, Alexander, Subhashini Kannan, Nilani, Egavalli, Vinoth Babu, Neenu Karthika and is directed by Jai Amarsingh. It was aired on 20 February 2018 to 21 December 2019 on Colors Tamil on every Monday to Saturday at 20:00 (IST). This story is set in rural Tamil Nadu.

Synopsis
The show is about the story of a single mother, Maheshwari, who overcomes barriers in society in order to raise her daughter as a successful IPS officer.

Cast

Main
 Nakshatra Srinivas as Sivagami IPS − Rajkumar and Maheshwari's daughter
 Anushya Hrithik as young Sivagami
 Ranjana as Maheshwari − Rajkumar's wife; Sivagami's mother
 Neenu Karthika as young Maheshwari 
 Vinoth Babu as Rajkumar − Maheshwari's husband (Dead) (Episodes: 1 − 188)
 Benito as Vivek − Sivagami's love interest and best friend

Recurring
 Subhashini Kannan as Krishnaveni − Maheshwari's mother; Sivagami's maternal grandmother
 Bala Subramani as Rajavel − Maheshwari's father; Sivagami's maternal grandfather
 Nivisha Kingkon as Thenmalar − Maheshwari's younger sister; Bharani's wife (dead in serial)
 Anandha Krishnan as Sakthivel − Maheshwari's elder brother; Sivagami's elder maternal uncle
 Egavalli as Padmavathi − Maheshwari's elder sister-in-law; Sakthivel's wife; Sivagami's elder maternal aunt (dead in serial)
 Alexander Francis as Manickkam − Padmavathi's younger brother (dead in serial)
 Ajay Barath as Rajaangam − Sakthivel's son
 Yukta Malnad (Anjana Gowda) as Jennie − Rajaangam's wife
 Raveena Daha as Rajeshwari − Sakthivel's daughter
 Reehana Begam as Selvi − Manickkam's wife
 Sindhuja as Shruthi − Manickkam's daughter
 B. Nilani as Eshwari − Padmavathi and Manickkam's mother
 Rosario as Punniyakodi − Padmavathi and Manickkam's father (dead in serial)
 Pandian as Bharani − Rajkumar's younger brother; Thenmalar's husband (dead in serial)
 Vinoth Kumar as Senthil − Rajkumar's friend
 Enok Ershath as Parattai − Rajkumar's friend
 Stella as Chellamma − Rajkumar and Bharani's mother
 Unknown as Madivadini − Police Officer

Casting
The series is a village romance family story. Also talks about horrors of Honour killing. Neenu Karthika, formerly of the series Vaidehi (2013-2014) and Muthaaram (2014-2015) play lead roles. Neenu Karthika made her comeback after three years. Subhashini kannan, B. Nilani, Egavalli, Anandha Krishnan, Vinoth Babu were selected for main roles. Anand krishnan who is the antagonist is a tough to many cinema villains. The serial has received praise from critics for its bold storyline and mesmerizing screenplay.

Title song

Soundtrack

References

External links
 Colors Tamil Official Facebook in Tamil
 Colors Tamil Official Youtube Channel in Tamil

Colors Tamil original programming
2010s Tamil-language television series
2018 Tamil-language television series debuts
Tamil-language television shows
2019 Tamil-language television series endings